Patrick Thomas 'Paddy' Deagan (16 June 1931 – 14 August 2016) was an Australian rules footballer who played with South Melbourne in the Victorian Football League (VFL).

Notes

External links 

1931 births
Australian rules footballers from Victoria (Australia)
Sydney Swans players
2016 deaths